The Upper Douglas Cable Tramway (Manx: Raad Yiarn Caabyl Ghoolish Heose) was a tram line serving all points between the southern end of the promenade and the upper part of the town of Douglas in the Isle of Man. It opened on 15 August 1896 and closed on 19 August 1929.

History
Douglas Corporation, the local authority responsible for the area, persuaded the Isle of Man Tramways & Electric Power Company to build a line serving the hilly area of Upper Douglas in return for an extended franchise to operate the horse tramway. The line was built to  narrow gauge. Douglas Corporation acquired the tramway in 1902 after the collapse of Dumbell's Bank and the section south of the depot in York Road was closed as it was felt that the gradient made it too dangerous to operate. The service was downgraded to seasonal in 1922. After the line closed, the tracks remained in place until they were lifted in 1932. (in contradiction to this source however road works in the 1980s revealed some of the rails buried well under the modern road surface; in addition, in Waverley Road, on the depot entrance, a set of tramway rails and points remain; however, this may actually be from the time that the depot was used to service the horse trams: they were towed up to the depot using double decker buses). In January 2000, work in connection with the IRIS scheme unearthed the terminal cable pit at Broadway.

Route
Both termini were on Douglas Promenade, at the Clock Tower and Broadway. The line followed a U shaped route serving Victoria Street, Prospect Hill, Buck's Road, Woodbourne Road, York Road, Ballaquayle Road, and Broadway. There was a set of points connecting with the horse tramway at the Clock Tower. A proposed link to the horse tramway at Broadway was not built.

Rolling stock
There were fifteen trams on the system.

 67 Built 1911 by Milnes Voss. Crossbench car.
 68 Built 1909 by Milnes Voss. Crossbench car.
 69 – 70 Built 1907 by United Electric. Crossbench cars.
 71 – 78 Built 1896 by G.F. Milnes & Co. Crossbench cars. No. 77 rebuilt as saloon in 1903. No. 78 rebuilt as saloon in 1904.
 79 – 81 Built 1911 by G. F. Milnes. Saloon cars.

After the closure of the line, two of the cars, No. 72 and No. 73 were turned into a bungalow at Jurby. Both vehicles retained their bogies. They had been built by G. F. Milnes in 1896. In 1968, these two vehicles were rescued by the Douglas Cable Car Group, and a restoration was carried out between then and 1976, using the best of both cars. The tram now bears the number 72 on one end and 73 on the other, it has been converted to work by battery power and is sometimes seen running on the horse tramway.

Tram 72/73 is now based at the Jurby Transport Museum.

Stamp
The Upper Douglas Cable Tramway featured on a 13p stamp issued by the Isle of Man Post Office in 1988.

References

Railway lines in the Isle of Man
3 ft gauge railways in the Isle of Man
Tram transport in the Isle of Man